Lieutenant Colonel Charles George Tottenham (1835 – 23 Apr 1918) from County Wexford was an Irish officer in the British Army and a Conservative politician.

Tottenham was the son of Charles Tottenham (1807–1886) from Ballycurry and New Ross in County Wexford and his wife Isabella Airey, daughter of General Sir George Airey. His family were wealthy land owners in County Wexford. He was educated at Eton, and married his cousin, who was a daughter of Reverend Sir Francis Stapleton, 7th Baronet, of Henley-on-Thames.

He was a lieutenant colonel in the Scots Fusilier Guards, and served in the Crimean War.

He was elected at the June 1863 New Ross by-election as the Member of Parliament (MP) for borough of New Ross, following the resignation of his father.
He was the fourth father-and-son-Tottenham to hold the seat in the Westminster Parliament; two previous generations had been MPs for New Ross in the pre-union Parliament of Ireland. (Most of the town of New Ross was owned by the Tottenhams, who let it on short leases. They had shared control of the borough with the Leigh family of Rosegarland, and alternated the nomination of MPs).

Tottenham was re-elected in 1865, but stood down at the 1868 election. He was returned to the House of Commons again a by-election in December 1878, following the death of the Home Rule League MP John Dunbar. However, he was defeated at the 1880 general election by the Home Rule candidate Joseph Foley.

He was a Deputy Lieutenant of County Wicklow and High Sheriff of Wexford in 1874.

References

External links 
 

1835 births
1918 deaths
Irish Conservative Party MPs
Members of the Parliament of the United Kingdom for County Wexford constituencies (1801–1922)
UK MPs 1859–1865
UK MPs 1865–1868
UK MPs 1874–1880
People from New Ross
British Army personnel of the Crimean War
People educated at Eton College
Scots Guards officers
Deputy Lieutenants of Wicklow
High Sheriffs of Wexford